Sir James La Roche (or Laroche), 1st Baronet (24 June 1734 – September 1804), was a British slave trader and politician. He was a younger son of John Laroche, M.P.

James La Roche was a Bristol slave trader. He was Sheriff of Bristol for 1764–5 and a master of the Society of Merchant Venturers in 1782–83. In the mid 18th century he purchased the Elizabethan mansion Over Court near Almondsbury, Gloucestershire.

He represented Bodmin in Parliament between 1768 and 1780. In 1776 he was created a baronet, of Over in the Parish of Aldmondbury in the County of Gloucester. He was declared a bankrupt in 1778.

La Roche died in September 1804, aged 70, when the baronetcy became extinct. He had married twice: firstly Elizabeth, the daughter and heiress of John Yeamans of Antigua, and the widow of William Yeamans Archbould of Antigua and Bristol and secondly ?Elizabeth, with whom he had one son.

References

 

1734 births
1804 deaths
British MPs 1768–1774
British MPs 1774–1780
Members of the Parliament of Great Britain for constituencies in Cornwall
Baronets in the Baronetage of Great Britain
British slave traders
High Sheriffs of Bristol
People from Almondsbury
Members of the Society of Merchant Venturers